Vaddakkachchi Maha Vidyalayam ( Vaṭṭakkacci Makā Vittiyālayam) is a provincial school in Vaddakkachchi, Sri Lanka.

See also
 List of schools in Northern Province, Sri Lanka

References

External links
 Vaddakkachchi Maha Vidyalayam

Provincial schools in Sri Lanka
Schools in Kilinochchi District